Disgrace is a 1929 Czech-German silent film directed by Josef Medeotti-Bohác and starring Jindrich Lhoták, Carl de Vogt and Ita Rina.

The film's art direction was by Alois Mecera.

Cast
 Jindrich Lhoták as Lukas
 Carl de Vogt as JUDr. Holan
 Ita Rina as Marta Holanová
 Jindrich Slovák as JUDr. Cejka
 Ella Voldánová as Mrs. Zatecká
 Ella Nollová as Emma
 Jan W. Speerger as Jakub
 Hans Eckert as Pavel Lacina
  as Olga Kustková
 Jirí Sedlácek as Young Dandy
 Leon Ratom as Hadácek
 Sasa Dobrovolná as Poor Woman
 Robert Ford as Bar Guest
 Bonda Szynglarski as Bar Guest

References

Bibliography 
 Sergio Grmek Germani. La meticcia di fuoco: oltre il continente Balcani. Lindau, 2000.

External links 
 

1929 films
Films of the Weimar Republic
German silent feature films
Czech silent feature films
German black-and-white films
Czech black-and-white films
1920s German films